
Gouy may refer to:

Places

Belgium
Gouy-lez-Piéton

Communes in France
 Gouy, Aisne, in the department of Aisne
 Gouy, Seine-Maritime, in the department of Seine-Maritime
 Gouy-en-Artois, in the department of Pas-de-Calais
 Gouy-en-Ternois, in the department of Pas-de-Calais
 Gouy-les-Groseillers, in the department of Oise
 Gouy-Saint-André, in the department of Pas-de-Calais
 Gouy-Servins, in the department of Pas-de-Calais
 Gouy-sous-Bellonne, in the department of Pas-de-Calais

Other uses
Louis Georges Gouy, a French physicist
Gouy balance